Giovanni Barcia was the last Ordinary of the Italo-Albanian Catholic Church from 1902 until his death in 1912.

Biography
Giovanni Barcia was born in Palazzo Adriano (PA) in 1829, during that time in the territory of the Latin diocese of Monreale. 

On 24 April 1902, he was appointed to be the Bishop of the Italo-Albanian Catholic Church by Pope Leo XIII. Later, on 24 June 1902, Giovanni Barcia was consecrated as a bishop by Cardinal Vincenzo Vannutelli with co-consecrators Archbishop Giustino Adami and the future Latin Patriarch of Antioch Wladyslaw Michal Zaleski. Pope Leo XIII gave him the titular see of Croae and Giovanni went on to lead the Italo-Albanian Catholic Church for ten years. 

Giovanni Barcia resided in Naples and was also the superior of the College of San Adriano in San Demetrio Corone (CS), Calabria. Bishop Giovanni Barcia was also the president of the Italian Clergy Committee for the relief of those affected by the Calabria earthquake.

References

Italian Eastern Catholic bishops
1829 births
1912 deaths
People from Palazzo Adriano
Religious leaders from the Province of Palermo